Quilamba Quiaxi, also spelled as Kilamba Kiaxi, is a city and one of nine municipalities that make up the province of Luanda in Angola. In the Kimbundu language the name means Land (Kiaxi) of Kilamba.

According to the population projections of 2018, prepared by the National Institute of Statistics, it has a population of approximately 750 000 inhabitants and a territorial area of 64.1 km².

Geography 
It is limited to the west with the urban district of Maianga, to the north with the urban district of Rangel and the municipality of Cazenga, to the east the municipality of Viana and to the south with the municipality of Talatona. It is only the commune, which is subdivided into the urban districts of Golfe , Golfe II, Palanca, Vila Estoril and Sapú.

In 2011, due to administrative reform, it was classified as Luanda's urban district, but in 2016 it regained the status of municipality.

See also
 Quilamba

References

External links 
 Angolan subdivisions
 Municipal Administration of Kilamba Kiaxi

Luanda
Municipalities in Luanda
Populated places in Luanda Province